Tulumba or Bamiyeh (Persian: بامیه) is a deep-fried dessert found in Turkey and the regional cuisines of the former Ottoman Empire. It is a fried batter soaked in syrup, similar to jalebis and churros. It is made from unleavened choux pastry dough (usually about 3 cm long) piped with a pastry bag using an open star or similar tip. It is first deep-fried to golden colour and then sugar-sweet syrup is poured over it when still hot. It is eaten cold.

Name

Tulumba literally means 'pump' in Turkish, deriving from the Italian . The dessert is called pomba in Cypriot Greek and bombacık in Cypriot Turkish. In Armenian cuisine it may be called either pomp or tulumba (Armenian: թուլումբա). Tulumba features in Albanian, Serbian, Bosnian, Bulgarian, Macedonian, Greek, Azeri and Turkish cuisines. The sweet is also found in Persian cuisine as bamiyeh, after the vegetable of the same Persian name (okra), due to its shape. In  Iraqi cuisine it is known as datli, directly coming from Turkish word tatlı.

Main ingredients 
It is made from a yogurt and starch based dough, which is fried before being dipped in syrup. It is a special sweet often enjoyed at Iftar in Ramadan. It is also commonly sold alongside jalebi, which is prepared in a similar way, but arranged in a web-like arrangement of strips of dough.

Gallery

See also
 List of doughnut varieties
 List of fried dough varieties
 List of Turkish desserts
 Bamiyeh
 Churro
 Jalebi
 Lokma
 Fartura (food)

References

External links

Doughnuts
Ottoman cuisine
Arab cuisine
Iranian pastries
Iftar foods
Turkish desserts
Jewish desserts
Israeli desserts
Balkan cuisine
Persian Jewish cuisine
Sephardi Jewish cuisine
Albanian cuisine
Choux pastry